Einar Ræder (2 February 1896 – 10 March 1976) was a Norwegian long jumper. He represented Kristiania IF in Oslo.

Ræder was born in Rindal in Møre og Romsdal county. At the 1920 Summer Olympics he finished eighth in the long jump final with a jump of 6.585 metres. He also competed in decathlon, but did not finish the competition. He never became Norwegian champion in long jump, but won the Norwegian championships in pentathlon in 1920 and 1923 and decathlon in 1922 and 1923.

His personal best jump was 7.07 metres, achieved on 4 September 1920 in Trondheim.

Ræder died in Levanger, Nord-Trøndelag county.

References

1896 births
1976 deaths
Norwegian male long jumpers
Athletes (track and field) at the 1920 Summer Olympics
Olympic athletes of Norway
Olympic decathletes
People from Rindal
Sportspeople from Møre og Romsdal
20th-century Norwegian people